Holiday (French: Vacances) is a 1931 French comedy film directed by Robert Boudrioz and starring Florelle, Lucien Gallas and Georges Charlia.

The film's sets were designed by the art director Georges Wakhévitch.

Plot summary

Cast
 Florelle as Paulette 
 Lucien Gallas as Jacques Sarmette 
 Georges Charlia as Millet 
 Rachelly as La servante de l'auberge 
 Pierre Juvenet as Le Hubleau-Mornac

References

Bibliography 
 Goble, Alan. The Complete Index to Literary Sources in Film. Walter de Gruyter, 1999.

External links 
 
 

1931 films
French comedy films
1931 comedy films
1930s French-language films
Films directed by Robert Boudrioz
French films based on plays
Gaumont Film Company films
French black-and-white films
1930s French films